The 1995 Men's South American Volleyball Championship, took place in 1995 in Porto Alegre, Brazil.

Final positions

Mens South American Volleyball Championship, 1995
Men's South American Volleyball Championships
1995 in South American sport
International volleyball competitions hosted by Brazil 
1995 in Brazilian sport